Paul S. Cederna is an American plastic surgeon who is Robert Oneal Professor of Plastic Surgery, Chief of the Section of Plastic Surgery, and Professor in the Department of Biomedical Engineering at the University of Michigan.

Education 
He earned his BSc in Biomedical Engineering from the University of Michigan College of Engineering and medical degree from the University of Michigan Medical School. He went to the University of Iowa Hospitals and Clinics for his residency in General Surgery and a fellowship in Microsurgery before returning to Michigan for a Plastic Surgery Fellowship. He subsequently completed two years of basic science research training as a post doctoral research fellow at the Muscle Mechanics Lab.

Career 
He leads the Neuromuscular Lab at the University of Michigan, along with Stephen Kemp and Theodore A. Kung, uniting biotechnology and surgical science.

Research 
Cederna specializes in reconstruction of complex wounds. He has also led projects developing robotic prosthetics that use signals from the brain through nerve interfaces for amputees, which was supported by the National Institutes of Health.

Honors and awards 
Cederna was elected the President of the Plastic Surgery Foundation in 2016. He has been named to the Top Docs list multiple times.

References 

Living people
American plastic surgeons
University of Michigan Medical School alumni
University of Michigan fellows
Year of birth missing (living people)